The Football League play-offs for the 1989–90 season were held in May 1990, with the finals taking place at Wembley Stadium. The play-off semi-finals were also played over two legs and were contested by the teams who finished in 3rd, 4th, 5th and 6th  place in the Football League Second Division, the 4th, 5th, 6th and 7th placed teams in the Football League Third Division  and the 3rd, 4th, 5th and 6th place teams in the  Football League Fourth Division table. The winners of the semi-finals progressed through to the finals, with the winner of these matches gaining promotion for the following season. The 1990 play-offs finals were the first to be played at Wembley Stadium.

Background
The Football League play-offs have been held every year since 1987. They take place for each division following the conclusion of the regular season and are contested by the four clubs finishing below the automatic promotion places. For the first three seasons the final was played over two legs but this was changed to a single match at Wembley Stadium from 1990.

Second Division

Semi-finals
First leg

Second leg

Sunderland won 2–0 on aggregate.

Swindon Town won 4–2 on aggregate.

Final

Demotion
Although they won the promotion play-offs, Swindon Town did not compete in the First Division during the following season. During the 1989–90 season the club was charged with 36 breaches of Football League regulations – 35 of which related to illegal payments made to players between 1985 and 1989.

A hearing to decide the club's fate was scheduled for 4 May – before the play-offs began – but this was postponed on legal advice just days before it was due when Swindon chairman Brian Hillier, club accountant Vince Farrar and former team manager Lou Macari were charged by police for "intent to defraud Inland Revenue by making payments without deducting tax or NI". (In July 1992 both Hillier and Farrar were found guilty of these charges, while Macari was cleared).

Hillier and Macari had already been punished by the FA in February 1990 for their involvement in a £6,500 bet being placed on Swindon losing to Newcastle United in a tie during the 1987–88 FA Cup. The bet was successful and netted £4,000 winnings. As this activity ran counter to FA rules that forbid any bets by club officials or players on their own team, both were found guilty. Hillier was given a six-month suspension from football, but after he (unsuccessfully) appealed, the FA increased it to three years. Macari was fined £1,000 (upheld after his own appeal), and Swindon Town given a £7,500 fine.

At a Football League hearing on 7 June, Swindon pleaded guilty to all 36 charges against them and admitted a further twenty. The league decreed that the club would be denied promotion and instead demoted to the Third Division. Six days later, it was announced that losing play-off finalists Sunderland would be instead promoted to the First Division. This was controversial as Newcastle felt that as they had finished third, three places above bitter rivals Sunderland, they should have been promoted instead. The FA's decision stood and Sunderland were promoted.

Swindon launched a High Court appeal against the Football League's double demotion, claiming it to be "harsh, oppressive and disproportionate to previous penalties". However, within days they dropped this action and instead appealed directly to the FA. On 2 July an FA Appeal Panel reduced the punishment to the club simply remaining in the Second Division; Tranmere Rovers – the losing play-off finalists in the Third Division – who were to have replaced Swindon in the second level were therefore denied promotion.

Third Division

Semi-finals
First leg

Second leg

Tranmere Rovers won 2–0 on aggregate.

Notts County won 3–1 on aggregate.

Final

Fourth Division

Semi-finals
First leg

Second leg

Chesterfield won 6–0 on aggregate.

Cambridge United won 3–1 on aggregate.

Final

External links
Football League website

 
English Football League play-offs
May 1990 sports events in the United Kingdom